Kizilkend or Kzylkend may refer to:
 Kyzylkend, Armenia
 Gizilkend, Azerbaijan